Rudolf Steiner wrote four plays that follow the initiation journeys of a group of fictional characters through a series of lives. These plays were intended to be modern mystery plays. Steiner outlined the plot of a fifth play to be set at the Castalian spring at Delphi, but due to the outbreak of First World War, this remained an unfulfilled project.

The titles of the completed plays are:
The Portal of Initiation - World premiere on 15 August 1910, at the Schauspielhaus in Munich.
The Trial of the Soul' or 'The Soul's Probation'. - World premiere on 17 August 1911, in the Gardener's Place Theatre in Munich.The Guardian of the Threshold - World premiere on 24 August 1912, in the Gardener's Place Theatre in Munich.The Soul's Awakening'' - World premiere on 22 August 1913, at the National Theatre in Munich.

Genesis of the characters
In these four plays. Steiner intended to show how spiritual development might manifest in a karmically-intertwined group of people. The experiences of the main characters of the play, particularly Johannes Thomasius, Capesius and Strader, represent aspects of the path of initiation "differing according to the karma of the respective individualities."

Steiner based the first play on Goethe's "Tale of the Green Snake and the Beautiful Lily".  In his first draft of the play, the names of the characters were those of the characters in Goethe's tale, but in the course of his work, he replaced the fairytale characters with characters of his own imagination.  The following table shows the names from Goethe's fairy tale and the characters these turned into in this first drama:

The characters of Helena and Lucifer have no precedent in Goethe's fairy tale and were to be played by the same actress.

Historical antecedents
In 1907, at the Munich Theosophical Congress, Rudolf Steiner had directed a play by Édouard Schuré, "The Sacred Drama of Eleusis".  Two years later, Steiner staged Schuré's "The Children of Lucifer". At this time, Steiner was looking for a spiritual content and artistic form that could reflect what he believed to be a new age in human consciousness.

Reincarnation and karma
For the first time in dramatic poetry, Rudolf Steiner in his dramas presents the driving forces of destiny events, openly and consistently on the stage.  The success of the characterizing people towards the inevitability of fate, has always been the main nerve of tragic poetry, and Steiner's characters also remain true to these causes, which are ultimately enigmatic. Rudolf Steiner was the background of the fate complications to their true causes, namely karmic entanglements in former lives on earth, returning and brought dramatically to display in the present for the characters on stage.  This is a critical and necessary impetus for the progress of dramatic art, even if it may take long time until it is taken up more widely by the public.

Lectures
Lectures on The Portal of Initiation:
Rudolf Steiner: The Secrets of the Biblical Creation Story, GA 122, lectures in Munich from 16.8 to 21.08, 1910.
Rudolf Steiner: The Gospel of Matthew, GA 123, lectures in Bern 2.9, 5.9, 10.9 and 12.09, 1910.
Rudolf Steiner: Answers to World and Life Issues through Anthroposophy, GA 125, lectures on 09.17.1910 Basel and 10.31.1910 Berlin.
Rudolf Steiner: From Jesus to Christ, GA 131, lecture from 13.10.1911 in Karlsruhe.

Lectures on The Trial of the Soul:
Rudolf Steiner: The Mission of the New Spirit Revelation, GA 127, lecture on 19.12.1911 in Berlin.
Rudolf Steiner: Wonders of the World, GA 129, 1st, 3rd, 5th, 10th, lectures in Munich.

Lectures on The Guardian of the Threshold:
Rudolf Steiner: Initiation, Eternity and the Passing Moment, GA 138, Lectures on 28.8. and 30.08.1912 in Munich.
Rudolf Steiner: The Value of Thinking for Sound Human Understanding, GA 164, lecture on 19.09.1915 in Dornach.

Lectures on The Soul's Awakening:
Rudolf Steiner: The Secrets of the Threshold, GA 147, lectures on 24, 27, 28 and 30, August 1913 in Munich.
Rudolf Steiner: Mystery centers of the Middle Ages, GA 233, lecture on 05.01.1924 in Dornach.

Music
Adolf Arenson composed the original music to accompany the four plays. Later productions had music by Elmar Lampson and Pedro Guiraud.

Notes

References
Christian Clement: The birth of the modern mystery drama from the spirit of Weimar. On the Relevance of Goethe and Schiller in the dramaturgy of Rudolf Steiner. Logos Verlag, Berlin 2007, 
Alice Rock: Memories of Munich samples to the mystery plays in the News Journal 1929 No. 38 and No. 39 and 1950 30 and 31.
Max Gümbel-Seiling: With Rudolf Steiner in Munich and some memories of the mystery plays in Munich, from "Messages from the Anthroposophical work in Germany" no. 7, March 1949
Wilfried Hammacher: The premiere of the Mystery Dramas by Rudolf Steiner, Publisher at the Goetheanum, Dornach 2010 
Wilfried Hammacher: Introduction to Rudolf Steiner's Mystery Dramas, published at the Goetheanum, Dornach 2009 
Wilfried Hammacher: Content reproduction of the four mystery plays Rudolf Steiner, Publisher at the Goetheanum, Dornach 2000 
Wilfried Hammacher: The basic elements of the language and Drama Art by Rudolf Steiner, Publisher at the Goetheanum, Dornach 2005 
Wilfried Hammacher: Short Guide to the Mystery Plays, published at the Goetheanum, Dornach 1995, 
Oskar Schmiedel: Memories of the samples to the mystery plays in Munich in the years 1910 - 1913 in "Messages from the Anthroposophical work in Germany" no. March 7, 1949
Rudolf Steiner: How to Know Higher Worlds, GA 10 (1904/05)
Rudolf Steiner: Four Mystery Dramas, GA 14
Rudolf Steiner: Drafts, Fragments and Paralipomena to the Four Mystery Dramas, GA 44
Rudolf Steiner: Natural and Spiritual Beings - Their Work in our Visible World, GA 98
Rudolf Steiner: Theosophy of the Rosicrucians, GA 99,  [1]
Rudolf Steiner: Humanities and Anthropology, GA 107,  [2]
Rudolf Steiner: Inner Development Impulses of Humanity. Goethe and the Crisis of the Nineteenth Century, GA 171,  [3]
Rudolf Steiner: History Symptomatology, GA 185,  [4]
Rudolf Steiner: The Art of Recitation and Declamation, GA 281 (1 967) [5]
Alexander Strakosch: Life Paths with Rudolf Steiner.

External links
 - I. The Portal of Initiation as a PDF document
 - II Examination of the soul as a PDF-Document
 - III. The Guardian of the Threshold as a PDF document
 - IV The Soul's Awakening as a PDF-Document

Modernist theatre
Austrian plays
Rudolf Steiner
1910s plays
Plays based on European myths and legends